Tokyo Korean School ( Tōkyō Kankoku Gakkō) is a Korean school located in Wakamatsu-cho, Shinjuku-ku, Tokyo, Japan; catering to the Korean expatriate community and to Japanese-Koreans living in and around Tokyo. It was founded in 1954. It is affiliated with the South Korean government and Mindan (민단). It includes an elementary school, a middle school and a high school. The total population of the school is approximately 1,100 students. The primary language of instruction at the school is Korean. However, there is an English language department and English library at the school. Educational essentialism is the main educational philosophy of teachers in both the Korean and English departments at the school.

Notable alumni 

 Kwon Ri-se
 Zico

See also 

 Tokyo Korean Culture Center - South Korean culture center in Tokyo

References 

Japanese international schools in South Korea:
 Japanese School in Seoul
 Busan Japanese School

Further reading 

 田端 広英. "同じアジアの小学生は、どのように英語を学ぼうとしているのか 東京韓国学校での「英語活動」の取り組み (特集2 新世紀シリーズ企画/学校に何ができるか(3)小学校の「英語活動」--そのヒント)" 総合教育技術 56(7), 58-61, 2001-08. 小学館. See profile at CiNii.
 朴 貞玉. "日本におけるニューカマー韓国人の子どもに対する教育戦略 : 東京韓国学校と日本の公立学校の違い (第43回日本言語文化学研究会)." 言語文化と日本語教育 (43), 86-89, 2012-07. お茶の水女子大学日本言語文化学研究会. See profile at CiNii.

External links 

 Tokyo Korean School website 

1954 establishments in Japan
Buildings and structures in Shinjuku
Educational institutions established in 1954
High schools in Tokyo
International schools in Tokyo
Korean international schools in Japan
Zainichi Korean culture